The Litany of the Eye of Horus is an ancient Egyptian text in the style of a funerary text, (offering formula). A small portion of the text is contained in a limestone wall relief fragment of painted hieroglyphs located in the British Museum (no. EA 5610).

The painted hieroglyphs for the relief segment in the tomb of the 19th Dynasty pharaoh Seti I are also carved in low raised relief.

The Litany of the Eye of Horus
The Litany of the Eye of Horus is a Middle Egyptian offering liturgy.

See also
Book of the Dead

References

Parkinson, 1999. Cracking Codes: The Rosetta Stone and Decipherment, Richard Parkinson, c 1999, Univ. of California Press {softcover, }

Ancient Egyptian funerary texts